The Time Warp of Dr. Brain is the fourth installment of the educational game series Dr. Brain by Sierra On-Line. The game's structure is similar to its predecessor, The Lost Mind of Dr. Brain: the player must complete several puzzles which appeal to a specific part of the brain; however, this game also adds a time-period based theme to each puzzle and the game's theme overall is time travel.

Gameplay
Like the previous titles, The Time Warp of Dr. Brain is a simple point-and-click. The objective of the game is to successfully complete a set of 10 puzzles. Throughout the game, Dr. Brain poses as an advisor to the player, constantly passing witty comments and suggestions. There are three difficulty levels: novice, expert, and genius, with each level containing its own set of predetermined puzzles. Each level has a set of 20 sub-games. Each game can be completed at the player's choosing, and the difficulty levels can be alternated between at any time; completion of each puzzle is based on the score accrued. A total of approximately 12000 points is needed to finish one of the games, with a win in novice, expert, and genius levels granting 250, 1000, and 2250 points, respectively.

At the start of the game is a mini-game similar to the video-game Space Invaders. This serves as the main menu of the game. The player must shoot the appropriate spaceship to choose options.

Reception

References

External links

1996 video games
Brain training video games
Classic Mac OS games
Sierra Discovery games
Sierra Entertainment games
Video game sequels
Windows games
Video games developed in the United States